The Wandsworth Demons are an Australian Rules Football club who play in the AFL London competition (formerly the British Australian Rules Football League). They are a founding member of the league and have been based at Clapham Common in south London since 1990.

They are one of two clubs that field sides in each of the 5 divisions; Men's Premiership, Conference and Social, and Women's Premiership and Conference. Wandsworth are one of the most successful sides in the Premiership with nine flags whilst the reserves grade side, the Clapham Demons, started playing in the Premiership in 1999 and were a founding member of the Conference in 2001. The South London Demons began in the Social Division in 2007, winning the inaugural flag. In 2014 the Demons were the first club to announce a ladies team for 2015 and in 2017 were among first clubs to introduce a second women's team for the newly created Women's Conference division.

History
Two Australians living in Clapham in 1990, Sean Angle and Craig Stephens, sourced a list of names in the area and held the first training session on 14 February, and the club was born. The club went on to win the inaugural season despite being regarded as underdogs in the Grand Final, beating Earl's Court by two points.

As the league was formed on the basis of promoting Australian Rules Football overseas, not just as a recreational outlet for itinerant travellers, the rules stipulated that 50% of the team had to be British. The club now fields the highest number of players picked from the London league to represent their country in the Great Britain Bulldogs. 
 
With the number of Australians looking to play in London increasing, in 1998 Martin Tunley and Sam Percy devised the idea of starting a second team, the Clapham Demons. The West London Wildcats followed suit in 2000, and the year after that the rules for the London Conference division were forged. North London, Wimbledon and the Gryphons subsequently entered second sides as well. In 2001 the Demons and Wildcats fielded three teams for the season. 
 
In 2003 the club grew into a multi-sports outfit. The Demonettes began playing netball, and a basketball team started as well. The netball club has grown into a fully sufficient outfit with its own committee.
 
In 2007, Sam Percy as AFL London President encouraged clubs to each try to field a third side, and the London Social grade began, with the South London Demons winning the first flag. This grade started with thirds sides from the big clubs in London, the seconds of Wimbledon, and teams from further afield such as Bristol, Reading, and Nottingham. It has since been joined by South East London Giants.

In 2014 the Demons announced a women's team, with Wimbledon Hawks, South East London Giants and North London Lions following suit. In 2015 the women's team won the inaugural women's league after finishing the season top of the ladder.

For the majority of the 1990s Wandsworth wore the jumpers of the Melbourne Demons club from the AFL, and these were replaced with the club's own design in the early 2000s, a jumper based on a pre-season cup jumper of the WAFL side the Perth Demons.

Their club song is sung to the tune of Battle Hymn of the Republic.

The senior men's team has never missed finals. The senior men have played in 16 Grand Finals, winning seven of them. They won the premierships in 1990, 1992, 1995, 1997, 1999, 2003, 2010, 2017 and 2018.

The women's premiership side have won the Women's League three times, in 2015, 2017 and 2018.

Honour Board

Notable players

Retired jumper numbers:
 K.Schubert - Number 4. Retired in 1996.
 M.Tunley - Number 11. Retired in 2001.
 S.Percy - Number 55. Retired in 2003.
 J.Cumming - Number 13. Retired in 2009.

Women 
In 2015 The Wandsworth Demons added a fourth team to their playing line-up, joining the inaugural AFL London women's league. The Wandsworth Demons women were minor premiers and premiers in their first season. And in 2017 The Wandsworth Demons were the first club in London to add a second women's team and help form the Women's Conference division, making Wandsworth Demons the only five team club in AFL London. In 2017 both women's teams played in the grand final with the Premiership women winning the 2017 season.

References

External links
 Wandsworth Demons Official Site
 Wandsworth Demons on Facebook

Australian rules football clubs in England
Australian rules football teams in London
1990 establishments in England
Australian rules football clubs established in 1990